Akina is a Japanese feminine given name.

Possible writings
Akina can be written using many different combinations of kanji characters. Here are some examples: 

明菜, "bright, greens"
明奈, "bright, Nara"
明名, "bright, name"
明那, "bright, that/what"
秋菜, "autumn, greens"
秋奈, "autumn,  Nara"
秋名, "autumn, name"
亜稀菜, "Asia, rare, greens"
亜紀那, "Asia, chronicle, that/what"

The name can also be written in hiragana あきな or katakana アキナ.

Notable people with the name
Akina, a member of a four-girl J-pop idol group Faky
Akina Homoto (法元 明菜, born 1996), a Japanese voice actress
Akina Miyazato (宮里 明那, born 1985), a member of a five-girl J-pop idol group Folder 5
Akina Minami (南 明奈, born 1989), a Japanese gravure idol
Akina Nakamori (中森 明菜, born 1965), a Japanese pop singer
Akina Pau, a Hong-Kong fencer

Fictional characters
Akina (秋菜), a character in the anime television series Najica Blitz Tactics
Akina Hiizumi (比泉 秋名), a character from the manga Yozakura Quartet
Akina Yashiro (八代 暁名), a character in the shōjo manga series W Pinch
Akina Nanamura (七村 秋菜), a character in the manga and anime series UFO Ultramaiden Valkyrie

See also
Akina (秋名), a mountain, appears in the anime Initial D

Japanese feminine given names